There are several Hip Tin Temples in Hong Kong. Kwan Tai (Lord Guan) is worshiped in these temples.

Kwan Tai Temples are also dedicated to Lord Guan. Man Mo Temples are jointly dedicated to Man Tai and Kwan Tai (aka. Mo Tai).

Note 1: A territory-wide grade reassessment of historic buildings is ongoing. The grades listed in the table are based on this update (10 September 2013) . The temples with a "Not listed" status in the table below are not graded and do not appear in the list of historic buildings considered for grading.
Note 2: While most probably incomplete, this list of Hip Tin Temples is tentatively exhaustive.

See also
 Martial temple
 Man Mo Temple (Hong Kong)
 Kwan Tai temples in Hong Kong
 Tin Hau temples in Hong Kong
 Places of worship in Hong Kong

References

Further reading

Taoist temples in Hong Kong
Guandi temples